Franziska Weber (born 24 May 1989) is a German sprint canoer who has competed since the late 2000s.

Career
She was Olympic Champion at the 2012 Summer Olympics in the K-2 500 metres with Tina Dietze.  At the same Olympics, she also won silver in the K-4 500 m.  At the 2016 Summer Olympics, she finished 5th in the women's K-1 500 metres event. She won the silver medal in the women's K-2 500 metres event with teammate Tina Dietze. She also competed as part of the women's K-4 500 metres team which earned the silver medal.

She has won 12 medals at the ICF Canoe Sprint World Championships, 3 golds (K-1 1000 m: 2010; K-2 200 m: 2013; K-2 500 m: 2013), 7 silvers (K-1 1000 m: 2009; K-2 500 m: 2011, 2017; K-2 200 m: 2014; K-4 500 m: 2011, 2013, 2017) and 2 bronzes (K-2 500 m: 2015; K-4 500 m: 2015).

In June 2015, she competed in the inaugural European Games, for Germany in canoe sprint, more specifically, Women's K-4 500m with Verena Hantl, Conny Wassmuth, and Tina Dietze. She earned a silver medal.

She first began canoeing in 1999, and made her international debut in 2009.  She has a degree in Civil Engineering from the University of Potsdam.

References

External links
 
 
 
 

1989 births
German female canoeists
Living people
Canoeists at the 2012 Summer Olympics
Canoeists at the 2016 Summer Olympics
Olympic canoeists of Germany
Olympic medalists in canoeing
Olympic gold medalists for Germany
Olympic silver medalists for Germany
ICF Canoe Sprint World Championships medalists in kayak
Medalists at the 2012 Summer Olympics
Medalists at the 2016 Summer Olympics
European Games medalists in canoeing
Canoeists at the 2015 European Games
European Games silver medalists for Germany
Sportspeople from Potsdam
Canoeists at the 2019 European Games